George Bytheway (27 March 1908 – 1979) was an English professional footballer who played in the Football League for  Coventry City, Mansfield Town and West Bromwich Albion.

References

1908 births
1979 deaths
English footballers
Association football forwards
English Football League players
West Bromwich Albion F.C. players
Coventry City F.C. players
Mansfield Town F.C. players
Guildford City F.C. players